Ceraunia or Keraunia may refer to:
Ceryneia, a city of ancient Achaea, Greece
Ceraunian Mountains, mountains of Albania